Lilbourne railway station was a railway station serving  Lilbourne and nearby Catthorpe in Leicestershire, England.

In the same year the company became part of the London and North Western Railway. The line through Lilbourne was single track until it was doubled at the end of 1878.

The 1923 grouping made the LNWR part of the London Midland and Scottish Railway.

British Railways closed the station in 1966. All that remains is the trackbed and a platform.

References

Disused railway stations in Leicestershire
Former London and North Western Railway stations
Railway stations in Great Britain opened in 1850
Railway stations in Great Britain closed in 1966
Beeching closures in England